Büllingen is a municipality of East Belgium, located in the Belgian province of Liège, Wallonia. On January 1, 2006, Büllingen had a total population of 5,385. The total area is 150.49 km² which gives a population density of 36 inhabitants per km².

Since 1977 Büllingen consists of 27 villages:

Büllingen, Honsfeld, Hünningen, Mürringen
Rocherath, Krinkelt, Wirtzfeld
Manderfeld, Afst, Allmuthen, Andlermühle, Berterath, Buchholz, Eimerscheid, Hasenvenn, Hergersberg, Hüllscheid, Igelmonder Hof, Igelmondermühle, Kehr, Krewinkel, Lanzerath, Losheimergraben, Medendorf, Merlscheid, Weckerath.

Geography
Its component village of Krewinkel includes the easternmost point in Belgium. The municipality also contains Rocherath, the highest village in Belgium, as well as the second highest point in Belgium, the Weißer Stein near Mürringen.

History

In the period 1815-1919 it belonged first to the Kingdom of Prussia and later to the German Empire following the unification of Germany. In 1920 it was ceded to Belgium under the terms of the Treaty of Versailles as part of the Eupen-Malmedy (East Cantons) area.

The town played a role in the Battle of the Bulge as the Germans attempted to advance through the Ardennes Forest in World War II.

Postal history
Büllingen post-office opened in December 1863, in the Malmedy county (Kreis) of the Aachen district (Bezirk) in the Rheinland province.

Postal codes since 1969: 4760 Büllingen; 4761 Rocherath. In 1969 Manderfeld 4778 (4760 in 1990).

Sports
The municipality has two main football clubs: KFC Büllingen of Büllingen village (matricule number 7257) and SG Rapid Mürringen of Mürringen village.

See also
 List of protected heritage sites in Büllingen

References

External links
 
 Official website